Bimba Devi alias Yashodhara is a 2018 Sri Lankan Sinhala language epic, biographical drama film written and directed by professor Sunil Ariyaratne. This historical biographical film depicts the life of princess Yashodhara, the wife of Prince Siddhartha. It is the 1304th Sri Lankan film in the Sinhalese cinema.

The film stars Indian actress Pallavi Subhash (who is making her Sinhala language debut in the film) and Indian actor Arpit Choudhary in the lead roles. Other supporting crew includes Sri Lankan actors Dineth De Silva, Sangeetha Thedani, Ajith Weerasinghe, Udari Perera, and Kamal Deshapriya. This is directed by Sri Lankan film director Sunil Ariyaratne‍.

The filming of the movie took place at Ranmihithenna Telecinema Park, Sri Lanka. The film was released on 26 April 2018, simultaneously with upcoming Vesak festival. The film screened 74 theaters worldwide and passed 100 days successfully. Screening of the film ended on 9 August.

Cast
 Pallavi Subhash as Princess Yashodhara (Voice by Ferni Roshini) 
 Arpit Choudhary as Prince Siddhartha (Voice by Bimal Jayakody)
 Dineth De Silva as Devadatta
 Sangeetha Thedani as Mahapajapati Gotami
 Ajith Weerasinghe as King Shuddhodana
 Udari Perera as Princess Nanda
 Heshan Manula as Prince Nanda
 Shammu Kasun as Channa
 Kamal Deshapriya as King Suprabuddha
 Thumindu Dodantenna as Poet
 Ruvi Lakmali as Radhita
 Nethsuka Muluthenrala as Rahula
 Wilson Gunaratne as Asita
 Anasta Gray as Uttara
 Jayarathne Galagedara as Naimanthika
 Isura Nissanka as Kokalika

Production

Development 
Following the commercial success of director Sunil Ariyaratne's film Paththini (2016) starring Pooja Umashankar, Sunil Ariyarathne announced his next production. The film became the first Sri Lankan film to be screened in Singapore when it was released in Carnival Cinema Theatre, Singapore on 2 June 2018.

References

External links

සුවඳ මල් නිතර පිපියන් රන්කඳට බිම්බා දේවි හෙවත් යශෝධරා
බිම්බා දේවී හෙවත් යශෝධරා සිනමා විමසුම
‘යශෝධරා’ මට අභියෝගයක් වුණා

2018 films
2010s Sinhala-language films
2018 biographical drama films
Sri Lankan drama films
Sri Lankan epic films
2018 drama films